Vasili and Vasilisa is a 1981 Soviet drama film directed by Irina Poplavskaya.

Plot 
Vasily and Vasilisa happily live in the village, raising seven children. But suddenly Vasily began to drink and hit Vasilisa, and she, in turn, drove him away.

Cast 
 Olga Ostroumova as Vasilisa Vologzhina
 Mikhail Kononov as Vasili Vologzhin
 Natalya Bondarchuk as Aleksandra
 Maya Bulgakova as Avdotya
 Andrei Rostotsky as Pyotr
 Polina Kutepova as Vologzhin's daughter	
 Kseniya Kutepova as Vologzhin's daughter	
 Natalya Dikaryova	as 	Tanya 
 Tatyana Dogileva as Nastya
 Nikolay Volkov as neighbour
 Georgiy Burkov as narrator (voice)
 Gennadiy Frolov as Sanya

References

External links 
 

1981 films
1980s Russian-language films
Soviet drama films
Mosfilm films
1981 drama films
Films based on Russian novels